Olav Eikeland (born 10 October 1955) is a Norwegian philosopher and working life researcher. Since 2008, he is professor of work research and research director for the Program for Research on Education and Work at Oslo Metropolitan University (formerly Oslo and Akershus University College of Applied Sciences). Since 2012, he is also vice dean of the Faculty of Education and International Studies. He was a researcher at the Work Research Institute from 1985 to 2008, and served as the institute's director 2003-2004.

Works
The Ways of Aristotle, Bern: Peter Lang, 2008
Action research and organisation theory, Frankfurt am Main: Peter Lang, 2008, with Anne Marie Berg
Erfaring, dialogikk og politikk; et begrepshistorisk og filosofisk bidrag til rekonstruksjonen av empirisk samfunnsvitenskap, 1992

References

1955 births
Living people
21st-century Norwegian philosophers
Academic staff of Oslo University College
Work Research Institute people